Forcipata is a genus of leafhoppers in the family Cicadellidae. There are at least 20 described species in Forcipata.

Species
These 26 species belong to the genus Forcipata:

 Forcipata acclina DeLong & Caldwell, 1936 c g
 Forcipata ancantha DeLong & Caldwell, 1936 c g
 Forcipata calipera DeLong & Caldwell, 1936 c g
 Forcipata citrinella (Zetterstedt, 1828) c g
 Forcipata demissa Logvinenko, 1981 c g
 Forcipata elianae Poggi, 2012 c g
 Forcipata euxina Gnezdilov, 2000 c g
 Forcipata flava Vidano, 1965 c g
 Forcipata forcipata (Flor, 1861) c g
 Forcipata forficula Hamilton, 1998 c g
 Forcipata frigida (Beirne, 1955) c g
 Forcipata glaucans Anufriev, 1969 c g
 Forcipata ips Hamilton, 1998 c g
 Forcipata lobata Beamer, 1938 c g
 Forcipata loca DeLong & Caldwell, 1936 c g b
 Forcipata magna DeLong & Caldwell, 1936 c g
 Forcipata major (Wagner, 1947) c g
 Forcipata montana Hamilton, 1998 c g
 Forcipata obtusa Vidano, 1965 c g
 Forcipata ohioensis DeLong & Caldwell, 1936 c g
 Forcipata ortha DeLong & Caldwell, 1936 c g
 Forcipata palustris Holgersen, 1993 c g
 Forcipata sicula DeLong & Caldwell, 1936 c g
 Forcipata triquetra DeLong & Caldwell, 1936 c g
 Forcipata unica Hamilton, 1998 c g
 Forcipata xlix Hamilton, 1998 c g

Data sources: i = ITIS, c = Catalogue of Life, g = GBIF, b = Bugguide.net

References

Further reading

External links

 

Cicadellidae genera
Dikraneurini